Rosamund Massy (1870–1947) was an English suffragette. According to Sir William Byrne, she was a fierce woman. She was one of three women who organised the Emmeline and Christabel Pankhurst Memorial.

Biography
Rosamund Massy was born in 1870, the daughter of Sir Casey Knywett and Lady Knyvett. Her mother was also a prominent suffragette.

She married a colonel in the Dragoon Guards and her husband was supportive of her activism.

She joined the Women's Suffrage movement around 1908 and in 1909 she helped Edith Rigby gate-crash a meeting featuring Winston Churchill in Preston and she smashed a window with a stone. She was imprisoned for the first time and she went on an hunger-strike. After one week her mother paid the fine and she was released. She was arrested another three times and imprisoned again in 1910 for one month, after she had joined the Black Friday event.

In 1913, together with her mother, she enquiried with Sir William Byrne at the Home Office about the condition of Emmeline Pankhurst who was imprisoned in Holloway Prison. The impression of Sir Byrne was that Lady Knyvett was a dear old lady and Massy a fierce woman.

Pankhurst's memorial's
When Emmeline Pankhurst died it was Kitty Marshall, Margaret, Lady Rhondda and Massy who decided to arrange her memorials. They raised money for her gravestone in Brompton Cemetery and a statue of her outside the House of Commons (which she was had frequently been stopped from entering). Money was also raised money to buy the painting that had been made by fellow suffragette Georgina Brackenbury so that it could be given to the National Portrait Gallery. Massy's prison badge and hunger strike medal were placed in a casket in the plinth of Emmeline Pankhurst's statue in the Victoria Tower Gardens. It was unveiled by Stanley Baldwin in 1930.

References

1870 births
1947 deaths
English suffragists
Hunger Strike Medal recipients